Sino-Korean vocabulary or Hanja-eo refers to Korean words of Chinese origin. Sino-Korean vocabulary includes words borrowed directly from Chinese, as well as new Korean words created from Chinese characters, and words borrowed from Sino-Japanese vocabulary. Many of these terms were borrowed during the height of Chinese-language literature on Korean culture.

Anywhere from 30-60 percent of Korean words are of Chinese character origin. Many of these words have also been truncated or altered for the Korean language.

History 
The use of Chinese and Chinese characters in Korea dates back to at least 194 BCE. While Sino-Korean words were widely used during the Three Kingdoms period, they became even more popular during the Silla period. During this time, male aristocrats changed their given names to Sino-Korean names. Additionally, the government changed all official titles and place names in the country to Sino-Korean.

Sino-Korean words remained popular during the Goryeo and Joseon periods. Ultimately, the majority of Sino-Korean words were introduced before 1945, including Sino-Japanese words themselves that were introduced to Korea during Japanese Occupation. In the contemporary era, Sino-Korean vocabulary has continued to grow in South Korea, where the meanings of Chinese characters are used to produce new words in Korean that do not exist in Chinese. By contrast, North Korean policy has called for many Sino-Korean words to be replaced by native Korean terms.

Usage 
Sino-Korean words constitute about 60 percent of South Korean vocabulary, the remainder being native Korean words and loanwords from other languages, such as Japanese and English to a lesser extent. Sino-Korean words are typically used in formal or literary contexts, and to express abstract or complex ideas.

All Korean surnames and most Korean given names are Sino-Korean. Additionally, Korean numerals can be expressed with Sino-Korean and native Korean words, though each set of numerals has different purposes.

Sino-Korean words may be written either in the Korean alphabet, known as Hangul, or in Chinese characters, known as Hanja.

Examples

Words borrowed from Chinese 
Sino-Korean words borrowed directly from Chinese come mainly from Chinese classics, literature, and colloquial Chinese.

Words created in Korea using Chinese characters 
These words below were created in Korea using Chinese characters. They are not used in China, Japan, nor Vietnam.

Words borrowed from Sino-Japanese 
Sino-Korean words borrowed from Sino-Japanese are used only in Korean and Japanese, not in Chinese.

Phonetic correspondences

Initial consonants

Final consonants 
The Middle Chinese final consonants were semivowels (or glides) /j/ and /w/, nasals /m/, /n/ and /ŋ/, and stops /p/, /t/ and /k/. Sino-Korean preserves all the distinctions between final nasals and stops. Although Old Korean had a /t/ coda, words with the Middle Chinese coda /t/ have /l/ in Sino-Korean, reflecting a northern variety of Late Middle Chinese in which final /t/ had weakened to /r/.

See also
Chinese influence on Korean culture
Korean language
Hanja
Korean mixed script
Sino-Japanese vocabulary
Sino-Vietnamese vocabulary

References

Korean language
Korean